The 1987 SANFL Grand Final was an Australian rules football game contested between the North Adelaide Football Club and the Glenelg Football Club, held at Football Park on 3 October 1987. It was the 70th annual grand final of the South Australian National Football League, staged to determine the premiers for the 1987 SANFL season. The match, attended by 50,617 spectators, was won by North Adelaide by a margin of 82 points, marking that club's 12th premiership victory.

Background
This was the third consecutive year that North coached by Michael Nunan and Glenelg coached by Graham Cornes met in the grand final. It gave Nunan his first success as a coach, and Cornes the first of 3 losses in 4 years.

The Jack Oatey Medal was won by North Adelaide ruckman Michael Parsons who top scored with 6 goals and 1 behind.

Teams

Match summary 
The match was played in superb conditions. Besides North Adelaide's crushing victory, this game would later become known for Ricky May's terrible performance of the national anthem before the game, forgetting the lyrics and falling out of tempo with the backing track.

Second quarter

Third quarter

Fourth quarter

Scorecard

References 

SANFL Grand Finals
SANFL Grand Final, 1987